Luo Wei may refer to:
 Luo Wei (taekwondo)
 Luo Wei (artist)

See also
 Lo Wei, Hong Kong film director